Leon van den Eijkel (15 October 1940 – 15 April 2021) was a Dutch-born New Zealand artist who studied at The Hague's Royal Academy of Art from 1958 to 1963, and emigrated to New Zealand in 1986. Van den Eijkel exhibited widely in Europe, the United States, and New Zealand, and is represented in many major public and private collections.

Biography 
Van den Eijkel was born in The Hague on 15 October 1940. He studied at the Royal Academy of Arts, The Hague, from 1958 to 1963. He moved to Leiden in 1967, and emigrated to New Zealand in 1986. He first settled in Wellington, remaining there until 1998, before moving to Auckland, where he lived for the rest of his life. Van den Eijkel died on 15 April 2021, aged 80.

Style 
His use of colour has been heavily influenced by the works of Mondrian which he saw as a child in his native Netherlands. After moving to New Zealand and visiting the kauri forests he was inspired to produce a series of works based on urban trees which culminated in the Urban Forest sculpture in Wellington. This work has the size and heft of a kauri tree trunk combined with his trademark primary colours. He collaborated on this work and other large fabricated steel pieces with the engineer Alan Brown and the team at Metal Art Ltd.

Public collections 
He is represented in major international collections including:

 Stedelijk Museum Amsterdam
 Museum Boijmans Van Beuningen, Rotterdam
 Museum van Hedendaagse Kunst, Ghent
 Museum of Modern Art, New York
 Museum of New Zealand Te Papa Tongarewa, Wellington

Notable works 

Mondrian after Mondriaan shown both at Galerir Stelling, Leiden (1993) and Museum of New Zealand (1995) 
Red Cloud Confrontation in Landscape (1996) – Gibbs Farm, Kaipara Harbour, New Zealand.
The Black Paintings (1997) New work Studio, Wellington New Zealand
Tourism on the Line  (1998) - Galerie Y-burg, Amsterdam
The Long Cloud Paintings (1999) Archill Gallery, Auckland, New Zealand
A Walk in the Clouds (2004) – New Zealand Embassy, The Hague, Netherlands
Light of Colour (2005) – Brian R Richards Ltd, Auckland New Zealand 
Urban Forest (2007) – Cobham Drive, Wellington, New Zealand
The Smiling Windmills (2008) – Avalon Park, Lower Hutt, New Zealand
Cross(Road) (2009) – Sculpture on the Gulf, Waiheke  Island, New Zealand
The Remembrance Windmill (2009) Sculpture by the Sea, Bondi Beach, Sydney, Australia
The Next Big Family Series (2009) Plantage Galerie, Leiden, The Netherlands
Towards Photography (2011) Toi Gallery, Waiheke Island, Auckland NZ
Colour Coding (2012) New paintings and works on paper. Bowen Galleries, Wellington NZ
Baubles (2013) Brick Bay Sculpture Trail, Warkworth, New Zealand 
The Playing Windmills (2014) Hobsonville Point  Primary School, Auckland New Zealand
The Geometric Totem Pole (2017)  Brick Bay Sculpture Trail, Warkworth, New Zealand..

References

1940 births
2021 deaths
Dutch sculptors
Dutch male sculptors
Artists from The Hague
Royal Academy of Art, The Hague alumni
Dutch emigrants to New Zealand
20th-century New Zealand sculptors
20th-century New Zealand male artists
21st-century New Zealand sculptors
21st-century New Zealand male artists